The 1918 Major League Baseball season featured a reduced schedule due to American participation in World War I. The American League and National League champions, the Boston Red Sox and Chicago Cubs, respectively, met in the World Series, which was won by Boston in six games.

Shortened season
With World War I ongoing, a "work or fight" mandate was issued by the government, requiring men with non-essential jobs to enlist or take war-related jobs by July 1, or else risk being drafted. Secretary of War Newton D. Baker granted an extension to MLB players through Labor Day, September 2. In early August, MLB clubs decided that the regular season would end at that time. As a result, the number of regular-season games that each team played varied—123 to 130 for AL teams and 124 to 131 for NL teams, including ties—reduced from their original 154-game schedules. Later in August, Baker granted a further extension to allow for the World Series to be contested; it began on September 5 and ended on September 11. World War I would end two months later, with the Armistice of 11 November 1918.

Statistical leaders

Standings

American League

National League

Postseason

Bracket

Managers

American League

National League

Notable events
 September 2 – In the last game of the season, against the Chicago White Sox, Detroit Tigers centerfielder Ty Cobb fields at third base and also pitches, yielding three hits and one run in two innings.

References

External links
1918 Major League Baseball season schedule at Baseball Reference Retrieved January 14, 2018

 
Major League Baseball seasons